Chase Lake is a lake in Itasca County, in the U.S. state of Minnesota.

Chase Lake was named for Jonathan Chase, a businessperson in the lumber industry.

See also
List of lakes in Minnesota

References

Lakes of Minnesota
Lakes of Itasca County, Minnesota